Mary Waldegrave, Countess Waldegrave, DBE (25 March 1850 – 8 November 1933) was a British peeress.

Background
Born as Mary Dorothea Palmer, she was the daughter of Roundell Palmer (later Earl of Selborne) and his wife, Laura, a daughter of the 8th Earl Waldegrave. She was known to family and friends as "May".

Marriage/children
On 5 August 1874, she married her first cousin, William Waldegrave, 9th Earl Waldegrave. Lord and Lady Waldegrave had three children:

Lady Mary Wilfreda (1875–1947)
Lady Laura Margaret (1880–1959)
William Edward Seymour, later 10th Earl Waldegrave (1882–1933)

Honours
In 1918, Mary Waldegrave, Countess Waldegrave, was appointed a DBE for her work as Deputy President of the Somerset branch of the British Red Cross Society during World War I.

1850 births
1933 deaths
British countesses
Dames Commander of the Order of the British Empire
Daughters of British earls
Mary
People from Mendip District
People from Somerset
Place of birth missing
Place of death missing
Waldegrave family